Dr. Alexander Tollmann (27 June 1928 – 8 August 2007) was an Austrian professor of geology.

He was born in Vienna. He had been professor at the Geologischen Institut of the University of Vienna since 1969. He was a political activist working to free Austria from nuclear energy and a founder of the Austrian Green Party  (Vereinten Grünen Österreichs or VGÖ).

In 1993, with his wife, paleontologist Edith Kristan-Tollmann, he published a monograph, Und die Sintflut gab es doch. Vom Mythos zur historischen Wahrheit, which claimed that Noah's flood was the consequence of a bolide impact about 9500 years ago, and supported the claim through geology (impact craters, iridium, shatter cones, stress lamination of minerals, radiocarbon dating, dendrochronology, a peak of acid in the Greenland ice) and legends and folk traditions. See Tollmann's hypothetical bolide.

Later in his life, he turned to esoteric fields and published obscure hypotheses for which he was strongly criticized by the scientific community. In 1998 the husband-and-wife team (posthumously; his wife had died in 1995) published Das Weltenjahr geht zur Neige: Mythos und Wahrheit der Prophezeiungen. The book was on the Austrian bestseller list for weeks. In August 1999, he predicted a world-wide catastrophe by studying the predictions of Nostradamus, that he awaited in his bunker in Lower Austria. In December 2003, Tollmann published Und die Wahrheit siegt schließlich doch (And the truth finally prevails).

References

1928 births
2007 deaths
The Greens – The Green Alternative politicians
20th-century Austrian geologists